Abdullah Fayiz Al-Zubi (born October 8, 1989) is a Jordanian football player currently playing as a goalkeeper for the Jordan national football team.

International career
Al-Zubi first joined the Jordan national senior team for the 2011 Pan Arab Games but did not play any matches until 10 December 2012 when his country played against Iraq in the 2012 WAFF Championship, in which Jordan lost 1-0.

International career statistics

References

External links
 
 

1989 births
Jordanian footballers
Jordan international footballers
Jordanian expatriate footballers
Living people
Al-Jazeera (Jordan) players
Al-Ramtha SC players
Ittihad Al-Ramtha players
Khaleej FC players
Saudi First Division League players
Expatriate footballers in Saudi Arabia
Jordanian expatriate sportspeople in Saudi Arabia
Association football goalkeepers